The Great Norwegian Encyclopedia (abbreviated SNL), is a Norwegian-language online encyclopedia.

The online encyclopedia is among the most-read Norwegian published sites, with more than two million unique visitors per month.

Paper editions 1978–2007

The SNL was created in 1978, when the two publishing houses Aschehoug and Gyldendal merged their encyclopedias and created the company Kunnskapsforlaget.

The respective first editions were published in 1907–1913 (Aschehoug) and 1933–1934 (Gyldendal).

The slump in sales for paper-based encyclopedias around the turn of the 21st century hit Kunnskapsforlaget hard, but a fourth edition of the paper encyclopedia was secured by a grant of ten million Norwegian kroner from the foundation Fritt Ord in 2003. The fourth edition consisted of 16 volumes, a total of 12,000 pages and 280,000 entries.

List of paper editions

 First edition, 1978–1981, 12 volumes. Chief editors Olaf Kortner, Preben Munthe, 
 Second edition, 1986–1989, 15 volumes. Chief editors Olaf Kortner, Preben Munthe, .
 Third edition, 1995–1998, 16 volumes. Chief editor Petter Henriksen.
 Fourth edition, 2005–2007, 16 volumes. Chief editor Petter Henriksen.

Online encyclopedia

The online edition of SNL was launched in 2000, and had both private and institutional subscribers. The paywall was removed on 25 February 2009, and the online encyclopedia became free to use.

On 12 March 2010,  announced that they would close the online encyclopedia because of lacklustre sales and failing revenue. It was also announced that the articles would not be given to the Wikimedia Foundation, with chief editor Petter Henriksen stating that: "It is important that the people behind the articles remain visible".

In 2011, the foundations Fritt Ord and Sparebankstiftelsen DNB acquired the encyclopedia, hired Anne Marit Godal as the new chief editor and established a new organisation, assisted by the Norwegian Academy of Science and Letters and Norwegian Non-Fiction Writers and Translators Association. In 2014  ('the Great Norwegian Encyclopedia Association') was established; members of the association are Norwegian universities and other non-profit organisations. In 2016  became the new chief editor.

As of 2019, the SNL has around 200,000 articles online, updated by approximately 800 affiliated academics. The SNL accepts contributions from users, but all changes to the articles are verified by a topic expert before publication.

References

External links 
   
 About the Great Norwegian Encyclopedia 

National encyclopedias
Norwegian online encyclopedias
1978 non-fiction books
Aschehoug books
Gyldendal Norsk Forlag books
20th-century encyclopedias
21st-century encyclopedias